The Logie Award for Most Outstanding Actress, commonly known as the Silver Logie for Most Outstanding Actress, is an award presented annually at the Australian TV Week Logie Awards. It was first awarded at the 30th Annual TV Week Logie Awards in 1988 and is given to recognise the outstanding performance of an actress in an Australian program. The winner and nominees of this award are chosen by television industry juries. Deborah Mailman holds the record for the most wins, with four, followed by Claudia Karvan with three and Ruth Cracknell, Alison Whyte and Sigrid Thornton with two wins each.

Winners and nominees

Multiple wins

Programs with most awards

References

Awards established in 1988

Awards for actresses